Arlindo Grund (born November 24, 1974) is a Brazilian television presenter, fashion consultant, stylist and magazine editor.

Biography 
Arlindo Grund of Portuguese-English descent, was born in Recife, Pernambuco. He holds a degree in Communication from the Catholic University of Pernambuco, post-graduate in Marketing from Faculdade Getúlio Vargas and a master's degree from Universidade Federal Rural de Pernambuco.

Filmography

Television

Book

References

External links 

1974 births
Living people
People from Recife
Brazilian television presenters
Brazilian LGBT entertainers
Federal University of Pernambuco alumni
21st-century LGBT people